The canton of Figeac-1 is an administrative division of the Lot department, southern France. It was created at the French canton reorganisation which came into effect in March 2015. Its seat is in Figeac.

It consists of the following communes:
 
Béduer
Boussac
Cambes
Camboulit
Camburat
Corn
Faycelles
Figeac (partly)
Fons
Fourmagnac
Lissac-et-Mouret
Planioles

References

Cantons of Lot (department)